Tomáš Hanzel (born 19 February 1989) is a Slovak football defender who currently plays for Velky Meder.

In August 2009, he was on trial in FK Fotbal Třinec.

References

External links
 

1989 births
Living people
People from Trnava District
Sportspeople from the Trnava Region
Slovak footballers
FC Spartak Trnava players
FC Petržalka players
ŠK Senec players
Slovak Super Liga players

Association football defenders